Anna Goodman (born 23 January 1986) is a Canadian alpine skier.

Career
Goodman competed on the FIS World Cup tour from 2004 to 2013. She competed in the slalom at the 2010 Winter Olympics on home snow in Canada, despite her suffering an anterior cruciate ligament injury at the Snow Queen Trophy race in Zagreb, Croatia shortly before the Games: she finished the Olympic slalom in 19th.

References

External links
 Anna Goodman at the 2010 Winter Olympics
 Official blog

1986 births
Living people
Olympic alpine skiers of Canada
Skiers from Montreal
Alpine skiers at the 2010 Winter Olympics
Canadian female alpine skiers
Anglophone Quebec people